Misleydis González Tamayo (born June 19, 1978, in Bayamo, Granma) is a female shot putter from Cuba. Her personal best throw is 19.50 metres, achieved in August 2008 in the 2008 Summer Olympics in Beijing. She has represented Cuba at the Summer Olympics three times, coming seventh in 2004 and second in 2008, and five times at the World Championships in Athletics (2005 to 2011)

She is a two-time Pan American Games champion in the event (2007 and 2011) and a three-time champion at the Central American and Caribbean Championships. She was the bronze medallist at the 2005 Summer Universiade. González placed fourth in the shot put at the 2008 IAAF World Indoor Championships.

Personal bests
Outdoor
Shot put: 19.50 m –  Beijing, 16 August 2008
Indoor
Shot put: 18.86 m –  Valencia, 28 February 2010

International competition record

References

External links

Tilastopaja biography
Ecured biography (in Spanish)
Picture of Misleydis González

1978 births
Living people
Cuban female shot putters
Athletes (track and field) at the 2004 Summer Olympics
Athletes (track and field) at the 2008 Summer Olympics
Athletes (track and field) at the 2012 Summer Olympics
Athletes (track and field) at the 2003 Pan American Games
Athletes (track and field) at the 2007 Pan American Games
Athletes (track and field) at the 2011 Pan American Games
Olympic athletes of Cuba
Pan American Games medalists in athletics (track and field)
Pan American Games gold medalists for Cuba
Universiade medalists in athletics (track and field)
Central American and Caribbean Games silver medalists for Cuba
Competitors at the 2006 Central American and Caribbean Games
Universiade bronze medalists for Cuba
Olympic silver medalists for Cuba
Central American and Caribbean Games medalists in athletics
Medalists at the 2005 Summer Universiade
Medalists at the 2007 Pan American Games
Medalists at the 2011 Pan American Games
People from Bayamo
20th-century Cuban women
21st-century Cuban women